Sharon is a city in western Mercer County, Pennsylvania, United States. The population was 13,147 at the 2020 census. It is a part of the Youngstown–Warren metropolitan area.

History

The Sharon area was first settled in 1795. It was incorporated as a borough on October 6, 1841, and incorporated as a city on December 17, 1918. The city operated under the Pennsylvania third-class city code until 2008, at which point it adopted a home rule charter under which the elected position of mayor was replaced with a hired city manager and financial officer.

The founding families of Sharon first settled on a flat plain bordering the Shenango River, between two hills on the southwestern edge of what is today Sharon's downtown business  district. According to local legend, the community received its name from a Bible-reading settler who likened the location to the Plain of Sharon in Israel.

Initially a center of coal mining, Sharon's economy transitioned to iron and steelmaking and other heavy industry after the arrival of the Erie Extension Canal in the 1840s. Following extensive national deindustrialization of the 1970s and 1980s, the city's economy diversified and is now based primarily on light industry, education, health care, and social services.

Prior to Prohibition in 1919, Sharon was once home to a large commercial beer brewery, Union Brewing Co., which was forced to close its doors like many U.S. breweries of the era.

The Frank H. Buhl Mansion was added to the National Register of Historic Places in 1977. 

Sharon is the home of the original Quaker Steak & Lube, which opened in 1974, and formerly The Vocal Group Hall of Fame.

Geography 
The city borders the city of Hermitage to the north and east, the city of Farrell to the south, and on the west the census-designated places of Masury and West Hill, Ohio.

The Shenango River flows through the city and provides drinking water to Sharon and several surrounding communities.

Demography

|footnote=Sources:

As of the census of 2000, there were 16,328 people, 6,791 households, and 4,189 families residing in the city. The population density was 4,342.6 people per square mile (1,676.7/km). There were 7,388 housing units at an average density of 1,964.9 per square mile (758.6/km). The racial makeup of the city was 86.44% White, 10.85% African American, 0.21% Asian, 0.18% Native American, 0.02% Pacific Islander, 0.23% from other races, and 2.08% from two or more races. Hispanic or Latino of any race were 0.88% of the population.

From the Census Ancestry Question, Sharon has the following ethnic make-up: German 21%, Irish 14%, Italian 11%, Black or African American 11%, English 8%, Polish 5%, Slovak 5%, Welsh 3%, Scots-Irish 2%, Hungarian 2%, Dutch 2%, French (except Basque) 2%, Croatian 1%, Scottish 1%, Russian 1%, Swedish 1%, Arab 1%, Slavic 1%, American Indian tribes, specified 1%. Sharon's Jewish community is served by the Reform Jewish Temple Beth Israel.

There were 6,791 households, out of which 28.1% had children under the age of 18 living with them, 40.7% were married couples living together, 16.6% had a female householder with no husband present, and 38.3% were non-families. 33.7% of all households were made up of individuals, and 15.5% had someone living alone who was 65 years of age or older. The average household size was 2.33 and the average family size was 2.97.

In the city, the population was distributed with 24.4% under the age of 18, 8.0% from 18 to 24, 27.2% from 25 to 44, 22.0% from 45 to 64, and 18.5% who were 65 years of age or older. The median age was 38 years. For every 100 females, there were 88.3 males. For every 100 females age 18 and over, there were 83.7 males.

The median income for a household in the city was $26,945, and the median income for a family was $34,581. Males had a median income of $30,072 versus $20,988 for females. The per capita income for the city was $15,913. About 14.0% of families and 17.6% of the population were below the poverty line, including 25.8% of those under age 18 and 8.8% of those age 65 or over.

Education

Children in Sharon are served by the Sharon City School District. The district colors are black and orange, and the school mascot is the Tiger. The following schools currently serve Sharon:
Case Avenue Elementary School – grades K-6
C.M. Musser Elementary School – grades K-6
West Hill Elementary School – grades K-6
Sharon Middle School – grades 7-8
Sharon High School – grades 9-12

Sharon is home to the Shenango campus of Pennsylvania State University, which offers several two-year and four-year degrees. It also hosts Laurel Technical Institute, a for-profit trade school, and the Sharon Regional Health System School of Nursing.

Tourism 
 Buhl Mansion
 Shenango River Lake
 Waterfire Sharon

Broadcast media

Television 
Because of Sharon's location on the Pennsylvania/Ohio border, it is served by WKBN-TV (CBS), WFMJ-TV (NBC), WYTV (ABC), WYFX-LD (Fox) and WBCB (CW), all broadcast from nearby Youngstown, OH.

Radio
Sharon is served by AM radio stations such as WLOA (1470 AM) (Farrell, PA), WPIC (790 AM), WKBN (570 AM) (Youngstown, OH), and by FM radio stations such as WYFM/"Y-103" (102.9 FM), WLLF/"The River" (96.7 FM) (Mercer, PA), WYLE/"Willie 95.1" (95.1 FM) (Grove City, PA), WMXY/"Mix 98.9" (98.9 FM) (Youngstown, OH) and WWIZ/"Z-104" (West Middlesex, PA).

Notable people 

 Mike Archie – former National Football League running back
 Carmen Argenziano – actor Stargate SG-1
 Teryl Austin – National Football League coach, Pittsburgh Steelers, Senior Defensive Assistant/Secondary coach
 Jane J. Boyle – judge
 Tony Butala – founder, lead vocalist, The Lettermen, president Vocal Group Hall of Fame
 Mike Connell – former National Football League punter 
 John Daverio – professor of music
 Jonathan Dresel – Drummer for Jimmy Kimmel Live and his older brother Bernie Dresel, Grammy Award-winning LA studio drummer known for the Simpsons, Family Guy and many others. 
 Nate Dunn – artist, Pennsylvania Impressionism School
 John H. Garvey – President, The Catholic University of America (2010–present)
 Charlie Gibson –  catcher for the Philadelphia Athletics (1905)
 Bob Golub – stand-up comedian, actor, writer, filmmaker
 Mick Goodrick – jazz guitarist
 Erwin Hahn – physicist
 Randy Holloway – former National Football League defensive end
 Marc Howard – former Philadelphia news anchor
 Marlin Jackson – National Football League cornerback
 Benjamin Jarrett – Republican member of the U.S. House of Representatives
 Jane Katz – (born 1943), Olympic swimmer
 John Kiriakou – former CIA officer convicted of violating the Intelligence Identities Protection Act; notable in waterboarding debate
 Ty Longley – guitarist, Great White
 John D. MacDonald – best-selling crime novelist
 Jack Marin – former National Basketball Association player
 Paul McKee – professor and author of children's reading primers
 Hugh McKinnis – former Canadian Football League and National Football League running back
 Bill Murray – nationally syndicated cartoonist and children book illustrator
 Grover Norquist - founder and president, Americans for Tax Reform
 Lester Rawlins – actor
 Mike Sebastian – former halfback in the National Football League and second American Football League
 Frank Secich – author, rock musician and member of the group Blue Ash
 Hershel Shanks – founder, Biblical Archaeology Society, editor, Biblical Archaeology Review
 Willie Somerset – ABA All-Star professional basketball player
 Lorenzo Styles – former linebacker for Atlanta Falcons and St. Louis Rams; head coach for the Marion Blue Racers
 James Henry Taylor – professor of mathematics
 Leo Yankevich – poet, translator, editor of The New Formalist

See also

References

External links
City website
Sharon, PA/city-data 
 

 
Cities in Mercer County, Pennsylvania
Cities in Pennsylvania
Populated places established in 1795
1795 establishments in Pennsylvania